Draw soup is the name of soups from the southeastern and southwestern parts of Nigeria that are made from okra, ogbono(Irvingia gabonensis),  or ewedu leaves (jute). The name derives from the thick viscosity characteristic of the broth as it draws out of the bowl when eaten either with a spoon or, more characteristically, by dipping a small piece of solid (fufu) into it. It can be served with numerous Nigerian fufu meals, including eba (garri) and pounded yam. Ewedu can be used to make a Yoruba soup that is traditionally served with amala.

Preparation 
The ingredients for draw soup include:

 Okra (Ilá)
 Ogbono (optional)
 Ugu vegetable
Uziza leaf
Locust beans
 Pepper
 Crayfish
 Ogiri okpei (optional)
 Meat
 Fish
 Red oil or Pal oil
 Salt to taste

See also
 Ewedu
 List of African dishes
 Okra
 Ogbono soup

References

External links
Babawilly's Dictionary of Pidgin English Words and Phrases.

African soups
Nigerian soups
Igbo cuisine
Yoruba cuisine